On the Trail of Igor Rizzi is a 2006 Canadian drama film starring Laurent Lucas, written and directed by Noël Mitrani. The film's production companies are Atopia and StanKaz Films. The distributor is also Atopia in Canada and United States. This film won the Award for Best Canadian First Feature Film at 2006’s Toronto International Film Festival.

Plot 
A grief-stricken and destitute French ex-soccer player has moved to Montreal, the hometown of his lost love, in an effort to recapture her presence. He is haunted by the regret of never having told her how much he loved her. To earn money he accepts to kill a certain Igor Rizzi.

Cast 
 Laurent Lucas as Jean-Marc Thomas
 Pierre-Luc Brillant as Jean-Michel
 Emmanuel Bilodeau as Gilbert McCoy
 Isabelle Blais as Mélanie
 Yves Allaire as Howard
 Dan Chapman as Igor Rizzi
 Jacinthe Pilote as The dead woman

Awards 
 2006 Toronto International Film Festival — Best Canadian First Feature Film
 2006 Canada's Top Ten

References

External links 
 

2006 films
Films directed by Noël Mitrani
Canadian crime drama films
2006 crime drama films
French-language Canadian films
2000s Canadian films